The Real Estate Pros (originally titled The Real Deal) is a television series which airs on the TLC network.  Each episode stars Richard C. Davis and his crew from Trademark Properties of Charleston, South Carolina as they purchase and renovate a piece of real estate.  Most episodes include the listing price of the purchased property, estimated cost of the renovation, and the market value (including potential profit) of the "flipped" property; however, one episode showed Davis renovating a quadplex owned by his company, in order to justify increased rents.

The series premiered on April 21, 2007 titled The Real Deal (directly opposite A&E's third-season premiere of Flip This House). The first episode of The Real Deal was "A Home Run For Trademark", a special centering on the relocation of the Shoeless Joe house, while at the same time helping to renovate the life of a current Major League Baseball player, Josh Hamilton. In June 2007, The Real Deal was renamed The Real Estate Pros.

At a recent fundraiser event in Charleston, Richard C. Davis, who heads Team Trademark, said he "intends to document the lodge’s rehabilitation as part of the real estate company’s reality series, due to air on TLC in April". The show had a five-year hiatus.

Crew
Richard C. Davis - Founder, Trademark Properties
Ginger Alexander - Investments, Trademark Properties. Richard's protégé
Dawn Nosal - Residential Condominiums, Trademark Properties. Richard's former assistant.
Vance Sudano - Real Estate Agent, Trademark Properties
Lori Nolan - Residential Division Leader, Trademark Properties
John Davis - Commercial Property Leader, Trademark Properties. Richard's brother.

See also
 Flip This House

External links

TLC's official webpage for The Real Estate Pros
 Real Estate Pros Compilation Page

TLC (TV network) original programming
Home renovation television series
2007 American television series debuts
2000s American reality television series
Television shows set in Charleston, South Carolina